is a former Japanese football player.

Club career
Teshima was born in Iizuka on June 7, 1979. After graduating from high school, he joined Yokohama Flügels in 1998. However the club was disbanded end of 1998 season due to financial strain, he moved to Kyoto Purple Sanga (later Kyoto Sanga FC) with contemporaries Yasuhito Endo, Shigeki Tsujimoto and so on in 1999. He played many matches as center back. The club won the champions 2002 Emperor's Cup. In 2006, he moved to big club Gamba Osaka. However he could not play in the match and returned to Kyoto in April 2006. In 2009, he lost his opportunity to play and retired end of 2009 season.

National team career
In April 1999, Teshima was selected Japan U-20 national team for 1999 World Youth Championship. At this tournament, he played full time in all 7 matches and Japan won the 2nd place. He played as center back on three backs defense with Shigeki Tsujimoto and Koji Nakata.

Club statistics

Honors and awards
 FIFA World Youth Championship runner-up: 1999

References

External links

1979 births
Living people
People from Iizuka, Fukuoka
Association football people from Fukuoka Prefecture
Japanese footballers
Japan youth international footballers
J1 League players
J2 League players
Yokohama Flügels players
Kyoto Sanga FC players
Gamba Osaka players
Footballers at the 1998 Asian Games
Association football defenders
Asian Games competitors for Japan